James William Ward (September 1, 1906 - November 15, 1990) was a Canadian ice hockey right winger who played in the National Hockey League (NHL) from 1928 to 1939 with the Montreal Maroons and Montreal Canadiens. Ward's son, Pete Ward, played nine seasons of professional baseball, winning the Sporting News Rookie of the Year Award honors in 1963 while playing for the Chicago White Sox.

Playing career
Born in Fort William, Ontario, he played his entire National Hockey League career in Montreal. It began in the 1928 season with the Montreal Maroons. He would stay with the Montreal team until they folded following the 1938 season. Along the way he scored 10 or more goals in 10 of 11 seasons during a time when the regular season was only 48 games long. He won the Stanley Cup in 1935. He played in the Ace Bailey Benefit Game in 1934 and the Howie Morenz Memorial Game in 1937. When the Maroons folded he joined the rival Montreal Canadiens for the 1938–39 season.

Coaching career
In 1940 he served as a player/coach of the New Haven Eagles of the IAHL. He would later serve as head coach of the Pacific Coast Hockey League's Portland Eagles and Portland Penguins.

Ward remained in Portland, Oregon after his retirement and died in 1990.

Career statistics

Regular season and playoffs

Awards and achievements
Played in Ace Bailey Benefit Game
Played in Howie Morenz Memorial Game

External links
 

1906 births
1990 deaths
Canadian ice hockey right wingers
Ice hockey people from Ontario
Montreal Canadiens players
Montreal Maroons players
New Haven Eagles players
Sportspeople from Thunder Bay
Stanley Cup champions